Gemar Mills is an American author and speaker. He was the youngest principal of Malcolm X Shabazz High School when he took the job at age 27.

Education
Mills was born and raised in Paterson, New Jersey. In 2004, he got his Bachelor of Science in Mathematics degree from Montclair State University, Montclair, New Jersey. In 2008, he received Master of Arts in Educational Leadership degree from American InterContinental University in Atlanta, and PhD in Education in Primary and Secondary Education in May 2017 from Seton Hall University.

The Future Project
Fortune Magazine reported in 2015 that Divine Bradley was hired by The Future Project to work as "Dream Director" at Malcolm X Shabazz High School. The Future Project partnered with Mills, who was then the school's principal, to address what was identified as one of the "country's most troubled high schools". The school was nicknamed "Baghdad", was being considered for closure, and had four principals in as many years. Newark schools had been part of an unsuccessful $100 million effort to improve the schools. The Future Project is an American non-profit organization aims to help underserved high school students.

References

External links

Living people
American school principals
African-American Christians
African-American schoolteachers
American motivational writers
American motivational speakers
American InterContinental University alumni
Montclair State University alumni
Seton Hall University alumni
People from Paterson, New Jersey
Writers from New Jersey
Schoolteachers from New Jersey
Year of birth missing (living people)
21st-century African-American people